The All Saints Episcopal Church church building, a historic Carpenter Gothic structure at Hall and Harrison streets, in DeQuincy, Louisiana, was listed on the National Register of Historic Places in 1983.  It is now occupied by, and may be known as, Grace Church, a non-denominational church in the United States.

History
The church was built in 1885 for Holy Trinity Episcopal Church in Patterson, which is over 160 miles east of DeQuincy. Holy Trinity closed when its membership dwindled and it stood unused for several years. In 1942 it was bought by All Saints which had it dismantled and taken to DeQuincy, where it was slowly reassembled. It was reconsecrated by a bishop in 1946 as All Saints Episcopal Church. The move and the addition of a side wing did not alter its architectural significance.

The church was added to the National Register of Historic Places on September 20, 1983.

Current use
Grace Church is an active congregation which holds Sunday services as well as special events. Also the church building is available for weddings and community events.

See also

 National Register of Historic Places listings in Calcasieu Parish, Louisiana
 All Saints Church (disambiguation)

References

External links
National register listings for Calcasieu Parish
 DeQuincy News feature on All Saints for the DeQuincy Centennial Celebration, 2007
 Archiplanet listing for All saints
 http://www.lat-long.com/ShowDetail-323-Louisiana-All_Saints_Episcopal_Church.html

Churches on the National Register of Historic Places in Louisiana
Episcopal church buildings in Louisiana
Churches in Calcasieu Parish, Louisiana
Carpenter Gothic church buildings in Louisiana
Relocated buildings and structures in Louisiana
Churches completed in 1885
19th-century Episcopal church buildings
National Register of Historic Places in Calcasieu Parish, Louisiana
1885 establishments in Louisiana